Aigle Royal de Nkongsamba is a Cameroonian football club based in Nkongsamba.

In 1971, the team won the Cameroon Première Division.

Achievements
 Cameroon Première Division: 1
 1971, 1994

Stadium
Currently, the team plays at the Stade municipal de Nkongsamba.

Performance in CAF competitions
CAF Champions League: 
1972 African Cup of Champions Clubs

References

External links
Foot-base

Football clubs in Cameroon
Sports clubs in Cameroon